Carroll University is a private university affiliated with the Presbyterian Church (USA) and located in Waukesha, Wisconsin. Established in 1846, Carroll was Wisconsin's first four-year institution of higher learning.

History
Prior to its establishment, what is now Carroll University was Prairieville Academy which was founded in 1841. Its charter—named for Charles Carroll of Carrollton, a signer of the United States Declaration of Independence—was passed into law by the Wisconsin Territorial Legislature on January 31, 1846. During the 1860s, the American Civil War and financial difficulty caused Carroll to temporarily suspend operations.

The board of trustees voted unanimously to change the institution's name from Carroll College to Carroll University effective July 1, 2008.

Presidents
John Adams Savage: 1850-63
Rensellaer B. Hammond: 1863-64
Walter L. Rankin: 1866-71*, 1893-1903
Wilbur Oscar Carrier: 1903-17
Herbert Pierpoint Houghton: 1918-20
William Arthur Ganfield: 1921-39
Gerrit T. Vander Lugt: 1940-46
Nelson Vance Russell: 1946-51
Robert D. Steele: 1952-67
John T. Middaugh: 1967-70
Robert V. Cramer: 1971-88
Dan C. West: 1988-92
Frank S. Falcone: 1993-2006
Douglas N. Hastad: 2006-2017
Cindy Gnadinger: 2017-
* Between July 31, 1871, and June 22, 1893, no college work was carried on. While the charter retained the college privileges, teaching was on the academy level. College work was resumed and the office of the presidency was filled again in 1893.

Academics 
Carroll University offers more than 95 areas of study at the undergraduate level, with master's degrees and certificates in selected subjects, as well as one clinical doctorate program in physical therapy. Its most popular undergraduate majors, based on number, out of 580 graduates in 2022, were:
Exercise Science and Kinesiology (105)
Registered Nursing/Registered Nurse (100)
Psychology (37)
Biology/Biological Sciences (36)
Business Administration and Management (33)
Elementary Education and Teaching (31)

There are 133 full-time and 258 part-time faculty members. 71.4% of the faculty have terminal degrees. As of September 2015, Carroll serves 3,521 students at the full- and part-time undergraduate and graduate levels. These students represent 33 states and 31 countries.

Campus
The campus is home to a variety of nineteenth and early twentieth century historical buildings, including Sneeden House (a 1922 colonial home now used as a guesthouse and conference center) and MacAllister Hall (a renovated, 19th-century mansion that now houses offices for the CFO, English, modern language, computational and physical sciences, chemistry, and the Division of Arts and Sciences). The school provides housing in six residence halls, six apartment buildings, and two houses.

The full campus stretches 132.8 acres, with the Main Campus around 50 acres, a four-acre Center for Graduate Studies located three minutes south of Interstate 94, a six-acre property southwest of campus and a 64-acre field research station in Genesee, Wisconsin.

Residence halls
 North Bergstrom Hall
 South Bergstrom Hall
 Shirley Hilger Hall
 Kilgour Hall
 Steele Hall
 Swarthout Hall
 Charles Street Hall

Apartment buildings
 Carroll Street Apartments
 College Avenue Apartments
 Frontier Hall
 Hartwell Avenue Apartments
 Pioneer Hall
 Prairie Hall

Traditions

Bagpipes
Since the 1960s, bagpipes have been a part of Carroll's opening convocation and commencement ceremony. Freshmen are escorted to their first assembly by a lone bagpiper, and upon graduation are led to commencement by a band of bagpipers. The rite of passage symbolizes Carroll's connection to its Presbyterian roots; early 19th-century Scottish immigrants settled in Waukesha, then known as Prairieville.

Ring the bell
A longstanding Carroll sports tradition, “Ring the Bell” is a ceremony performed by Carroll varsity teams following a win, when member athletes ring the school victory bell located at the northwest corner of Schneider Stadium. All teams participate—football, soccer, lacrosse—as long as the game is played and won at Schneider. In 2016 the victory bell was repainted and updated to feature the new Carroll Pioneers logo.

Athletics 
Carroll athletic teams are the Pioneers. The university is a member of the Division III level of the National Collegiate Athletic Association (NCAA), primarily competing in the College Conference of Illinois and Wisconsin (CCIW) since the 2016–17 academic year; which they were a member on a previous stint from 1955–56 to 1992–93.

Carroll competes in 23 intercollegiate varsity sports. Men's sports include baseball, basketball, cross country, football, golf, lacrosse, soccer, swimming, tennis and track & field (indoor and outdoor); while women's sports include basketball, bowling, cross country, golf, lacrosse, soccer, softball, swimming, tennis, track & field (indoor and outdoor) and volleyball.

Football
 See List of Carroll Pioneers head football coaches

The college football program at Carroll began in the late 1890s.  Past head coaches include Glenn Thistlethwaite, Vince DiFrancesca, and Matty Bell.  The current coach is Mike Budziszewski, who replaced Mark Krzykowski after the 2019 season.

On September 5, 1906, Carroll became the site of a milestone event in American football when Saint Louis University player Bradbury Robinson, coached by Eddie Cochems, threw the first legal forward pass in football history (though it was first used experimentally in the 1905 Washburn vs. Fairmount football game).

Basketball
In 2006, both the men's and women's basketball teams qualified for the NCAA Division III tournament for the first time in school history. The women won the Midwest Conference tournament and received the automatic bid, while the men's team received an "at-large" bid. Both were eliminated in the first round of play.

In 2007, both teams again qualified for the tournament. The Pioneers won the Midwest Conference tournament, during which freak power outages forced the championship game to be delayed and moved twice, first to Monmouth College, then to nearby Knox College. Upon reaching the NCAA tournament, they defeated 7th-ranked Augustana College in the first round of play, and 5th-ranked University of St. Thomas, to advance to the "Sweet Sixteen" sectional level. The women received an at-large bid to the tournament, defeating Illinois Wesleyan University in the first round, but losing in the second round to 25th-ranked Luther College.

In 2012, Carroll returned to the NCAA tournament, making it to the second round after defeating ranked Transylvania University.

Media
 Century Magazine, Carroll University's annual literary magazine, publishes art, photography, prose, and poetry created by Carroll students.

Rankings
Carroll University ranked No. 31 in Regional Universities Midwest in U.S. News & World Report 2022 America's Best Colleges.

In 2018, Forbes ranked Carroll No. 594 among 650 colleges in the United States.

In 2018, Money Magazine ranked Carroll No. 613 among 727 colleges in the United States.

Notable faculty
 Cardon V. Burnham, composer
 Edward Daniels, abolitionist & U.S. Civil War cavalry officer
 Jeffrey Douma, current Yale University music professor and choir director
 Edward Payson Evans, historian & linguist
 Tamara Grigsby, Wisconsin State Representative
 Philip Krejcarek, art historian and photographer 
 Ray Wendland, petrochemist
 Viola S. Wendt, poet

Notable alumni

 John M. Alberts, Wisconsin State Representative
 Walt Ambrose, NFL player
 Norris Armstrong, played professional football for the Milwaukee Badgers in 1922
 John Ball, author, In the Heat of the Night
 Herb Bizer, NFL player
 James Bonk, chemistry professor, Duke University (B.S. 1953)
 John W. Breen, NFL player-personnel manager
 Steven Burd, chairman, president and CEO of Safeway Inc.
 James P. Daley, U.S. National Guard general
 Moxie Dalton, NFL player
 David L. Dancey, Wisconsin State Representative and jurist
 Cushman Kellogg Davis, U.S. Senator from Minnesota
 Lyle E. Douglass, Wisconsin State Representative
 William Edwards, Wisconsin State Senator
 Paul Farrow, Wisconsin State Senator
 Howard Fuller, activist
 Karl George, NFL player
 Donald Goerke, inventor of SpaghettiOs
 Rudy Gollomb, played professional football for the Philadelphia Eagles
 William Henry Hardy, Wisconsin State Representative
 Bill Hempel, NFL player
 Kirk Hershey, NFL player
 Frank Hertz, played professional football for the Milwaukee Badgers in 1926
 Manville S. Hodgson, Wisconsin State State Representative
 Justin Jacobs, 2014 PECASE winner 
 Phil H. Jones, Wisconsin State Representative
 Theodore S. Jones, Wisconsin State Representative
 Daniel Kelly, attorney and former justice of the Wisconsin Supreme Court
 Mel Lawrenz, author, speaker and former senior pastor of Elmbrook Church
 Wally Lemm, NFL head coach
 Alfred Lunt, actor
 Fred MacMurray, actor (did not graduate)
 Vincent R. Mathews, Wisconsin State Representative
 James A. McKenzie, Wisconsin State Representative
 Dennis Morgan, actor
 Earl D. Morton, Wisconsin State Representative
 Adam Neylon, Wisconsin State Representative
 Lucius W. Nieman, founder of the Milwaukee Journal
 David W. Opitz, Wisconsin State Senator
Maybelle Maud Park, physician, Wisconsin state official
 Janet Parshall, radio talk show host
 Ivan Quinn, NFL player
 Antonio R. Riley, Midwest Regional Administrator of the United States Department of Housing and Urban Development
 Henry C. Schadeberg, U.S. Representative
 William C. R. Sheridan, Episcopal Bishop of northern Indiana
 Ed Sparr, NFL player in the 1920s
 Harper Starling (Amanda Hoffman) recording artist
 Gregg Steinhafel, Target Corporation, president and chairman of the board
 Douglas C. Steltz, Wisconsin State Representative
 Gil Sterr, NFL player in the 1920s
 Eric Szmanda, actor CSI
 Claude Taugher, professional football player for the Green Bay Packers in 1926
 Vernon W. Thomson, former Wisconsin governor and U.S. Representative
 Buff Wagner, played for the Green Bay Packers in 1921
 David W. Winn, U.S. Air Force general
 William A. Wojnar, classical organist
 Matt Christman, co-host of Chapo Trap House
 Riley Fay, television actor for Hearst Communications

References

External links
 Official website
 Official athletics website

 
Waukesha, Wisconsin
Liberal arts colleges in Wisconsin
Educational institutions established in 1846
Private universities and colleges in Wisconsin
Universities and colleges affiliated with the Presbyterian Church (USA)
Buildings and structures in Waukesha County, Wisconsin
Education in Waukesha County, Wisconsin
1846 establishments in Wisconsin Territory